Erik Poppe (born 24 June 1960) is a Norwegian film director, producer and screenwriter.

Poppe is regarded as one of Scandinavia's most experienced and compelling film directors recognized for his work with actors and multi-pronged narratives. His movies are often built around ensemble casts, sharp writing, impressive camera work and an uncanny knack for rhythm and music in the editing.

He is best known for directing critically acclaimed films including Hawaii, Oslo (2004), A Thousand Times Good Night (2013), The King's Choice (2016) and Utøya: July 22.

Early life and education 
Poppe was born on 24 June 1960 in Oslo to Aase and Per Frølich Poppe, who was a fashion designer in winter sport clothing. As a child he grew up in Portugal and Norway.

He started his career as a photographer for the newspaper Verdens Gang and Reuters, covering domestic news as well as international conflicts. Being hospitalized after an assignment in Colombia he decided to prepare leaving journalism and study filmmaking.

He graduated as a cinematographer at Dramatiska Institutet - University College of Film, Radio, Television and Theatre in Stockholm, Sweden in 1991. He have conducted several artistic and directorial research programs between 2001 and 2010.

In 2015 Poppe concluded a PhD as a research fellow at the Norwegian Artistic Research Programme and as an Associated Professor at HIL, Lillehammer University College/ The Norwegian Film School. "The Subjective Objective" is an exploration on how to achieve increased emotionally outcome by the use of a highly personalized and strictly subjectively point of view in conscious narrative film. -Is it possible to achieve a stronger identification, empathy and a greater involvement for the spectator by applying a strict enforcement of the subjective point of view? -A point of view who never allows the filmmaker to show for the spectator more than the film's protagonist are seeing or experiencing at any time.

The project developed various measures for an increased empathy with the narrative's protagonist and discuss further elements to be considered for a stronger subjectivity.

The key artistic work made as part of the research was the feature movie A Thousand Times Good Night, a dramatization of his experiences as a conflict photographer in Democratic Republic of the Congo and Afghanistan.

Career 
Erik Poppe worked as Director of Photography on several features, as well as EGGS (1995) by Bent Hamer. He was awarded with the Kodak Award at the Moscow International Film Festival and won the Cinematographer of the year award in Norway. By receiving the Kodak Award he announced his end of work as Director of Photography.

Oslo Trilogy 
Troubled Water (2008, aka: deUSYNLIGE) is the third part of his multi-awarded Oslo Trilogy, after his directorial debut with SCHPAAA (1998, aka Bunch Of Five) and Hawaii, Oslo (2004).

Working on the research for Schpaaa; a terrifying look at multi-racial youth gangs in Norway and shot in the style of a documentary, he discovered realities he wanted to adapt into two more movies.

Hawaii-Oslo tells a story about a number of people whose fates intertwine, sometimes by accident, during the hottest day of the year in downtown Oslo. Troubled Water is a story about a young man released from prison after serving a sentence for an alleged murder of a child. All of the movies are shoot in the area of Groenland and Grunerloekka in downtown Oslo. "The place where we live so close to each other, and know so little about each other."

A Thousand Times Good Night (2013, aka: 1000 Times Good Night, Tusen Ganger God Natt) was Poppe's first English-language movie. The film is partly an autobiographical story based on Poppe experiences as a conflict photographer. Poppe switched the lead roles around making the French actress Juliette Binoche as his proxy, and Game of Throne's -Nicolaj Coster-Waldau playing the character based on Poppe's wife. A standing ovation greeted Montreal World Film Festival's world premiere of the film, which went on to earn the Jury's Special Grand Prix.

The King's Choice (2016) is based on the true the story about the three dramatic days in April 1940, when Haakon VII of Norway is presented with the monstrous ultimatum from the Germans: surrender or die. With German Air Force and soldiers hunting them down, the royal family is forced to flee from the capital. After three days of desperately trying to evade the Germans, King Haakon makes his final decision, one that may cost him, his family and many Norwegians their lives.

The film made records when it opened in Norway by late September 2016 and became the #1 box office hit of the year. The film was Norway's official entry in the best foreign language film category for the 2017 Oscars and made a shortlist nomination for the Oscars.

Per Fugelli (1943-2017) was a Norwegian doctor, a professor of social medicine and a forceful voice in the public sphere. Fugelli spent his life addressing questions of freedom and respect, campaigning for rights of the less fortunate.

Fugelli was diagnosed with cancer in 2009. In 2015 he said no to further treatment and allowed his close friend, director Erik Poppe to follow him as far as possible on this journey. The result is I DIE (Siste resept) a film about life and how to live it to the very end.

In June 2017 it was announced that Erik Poppe had worked for a year on developing a feature film about the 2011 terrorist attack on Utøya outside Oslo, Norway.
The film, entitled U, begins 12 minutes before the first shot on Utøya as we meet Kaja (18), her little sister, and their friends at summer camp. When the shooting begins panic spreads, and over the next 72 minutes we follow Kaja in her escape – minute by minute. She becomes separated from her little sister, and in the search for her she finds other youngsters with different strategies for survival. Some make it, others do not.
U July 22 (Utøya 22.juli) is a fictional account of events which will tell the story from the young people's perspective, based on a series of in-depth interviews conducted with survivors from Utøya. Some of them was on set behind the camera while filming took place in September 2017 to help give the narrative credibility.

Erik Poppe was also the key director for "Brigaden" (The Brigade) in 2002. A 26 episodes TV-drama for NRK (The Norwegian Broadcasting Corp). Brigaden received the Norwegian "Amanda" Price for the Best TV-drama in 2003.

Awards 
Erik Poppe is the only director to have received the Norwegian National Film Critics' Award four times. Hawaii-Oslo in 2005, Troubled Water in 2009, A Thousand Times Good Night in 2014 and The Kings Choice in 2017 - all movies were also voted as last year's Best Feature.

When he received the price for best film in 2014 at The Amanda, he became historical by being the only director to have been nominated for all his feature movies (five movies) in the categories best film or/ and best director at the Amanda, Norway's national film prizes.

The King's Choice ("Kongens nei") was the Amanda jury's clear favorite at 2017's awards as well. Nominated for a record 13 Amandas — Norway's national film prizes — it snagged eight.

Poppe has participated in key festivals, and received prizes such as the Berlinale -Panorama (Schpaaa), The Vesuvio Prize at Napoli International Film Festival, Norwegian entries for best foreign language movie at Oscars, Festroia in Portugal for Best Directing, Silver Dolphin in Festroia, Nordic Ministerie Councils Award for The Best Nordic Feature, ecumenical awards.

Troubled Water made history at the Hamptons International Film Festival in 2008 by being the first feature to win both the festival's Golden Starfish for Best Narrative Feature and the Audience Award.

Poppe received the Special Golden Angel, the lifetime achievement award, for his work as Outstanding European Film Artist at the 2016 International Film Festival TOFIFEST in Poland.

Erik Poppe is co-owner of Paradox Film and the Paradox Group. A series of companies producing features.

On his career as a photojournalist: "All the actions I undertook back then were driven by the urge to draw attention to the horrors of war. I wanted for my pictures to grab you by the throat, when eating breakfast on a Saturday morning."

On working with feature movies: "You need to be honest, because this way your audience will be able to identify with the topic and the hero. My role, as an artist, is to prepare a text with open questions and hide the fact that I have an answer key. Questions will provoke audience to discuss the film and seek new perspectives. The film is supposed to make a difference, and maybe offer a therapeutic effect."

Filmography
Schpaaa (1998)
Brigaden (TV series 2002 about Norwegian firefighters) 
Hawaii, Oslo (2004)
Troubled Water (2008)
A Thousand Times Good Night (2013)
The King's Choice (2016)
I die. Documentary about Professor Per Fugelli (2017)
Utøya: July 22 (2018)

References

External links

1960 births
Living people
Norwegian expatriates in Sweden
Verdens Gang people
Norwegian photojournalists
Norwegian cinematographers
Male screenwriters
Norwegian screenwriters
Norwegian television writers
Norwegian film directors
Norwegian television directors
Male television writers
Dramatiska Institutet alumni